Events in the year 1949 in Taiwan, Republic of China.

Incumbents
 President – Chiang Kai-shek
 Vice President – Li Zongren
 Premier – He Yingqin, Yan Xishan
 Vice Premier – Wu Tieh-cheng, Chia Ching-teh, Chu Chia-hua

Events

January
 5 January – Chen Cheng became a Chairperson of Taiwan Province Provincial Government.

June
 6 June – The establishment of China News.
 15 June – The replacement of Old Taiwan dollar with New Taiwan dollar.

October
 25–27 October – Battle of Guningtou in Kinmen, Fujian.

December
 8 December – The Republic of China becomes exiled from mainland China, despite being a widely recognized UN member state, moved to Taipei as the de facto capital.
 21 December – Chen Cheng left as Chairperson of Taiwan Province Provincial Government.
 30 December – The establishment of Roman Catholic Archdiocese of Taipei.

Births
 20 January – Lin Bih-jaw, Secretary-General of the Presidential Office (2016)
 13 February – Yeh Chu-lan, Vice Premier (2004–2005)
 14 June – Peng Pai-hsien, Magistrate of Nantou County (2001)
 28 September – Hsieh Ing-dan, police officer
 29 September – Liu Kuo-chuan, Deputy Minister of Veterans Affairs Council.
 1 September – Chang Sheng-ford, Minister of Finance.
 8 October – Cheng Yung-chin, Magistrate of Hsinchu County (2001–2009)
 13 October – Sean Chen, former Premier of the Republic of China.
 30 October – Lin Chiang-yi, Minister of Council of Indigenous Peoples.
 14 November – Yen Ming, Minister of National Defense.

See also

References

 
Years of the 20th century in Taiwan